Tarapacá Airport  is an airport serving Tarapacá, a town and municipality in the Amazonas Department of Colombia. The town is on the west bank of the Putumayo River,  from the Brazilian border. The runway is just west of the town.

The ICAO code "SKRA" may not be active.

Airlines and destinations

See also

Transport in Colombia
List of airports in Colombia

References

External links
OpenStreetMap - Tarapacá
OurAirports - Tarapacá
Tarapacá Airport

Airports in Colombia